Trichilia casaretti is a species of plant in the family Meliaceae. It is endemic to the Atlantic Forest ecoregion in southeastern Brazil. It is a vulnerable species,  threatened by habitat loss.

References

casaretti
Endemic flora of Brazil
Flora of the Atlantic Forest
Vulnerable flora of South America
Taxonomy articles created by Polbot